Songs of Our Days, Op. 76, is a rarely performed cantata for mezzo-soprano and baritone soloists, chorus and orchestra composed by Sergei Prokofiev in 1937, during the height of Stalin's power. With rousing marches and text extolling (somewhat unrealistically) Russian virtues and Stalin's magnanimity, the work is composed in a much more approachable style than one would expect of Prokofiev's music during this period. 

The total work contains eight songs:

 March – a Russian march for the full orchestra only
 Over the Bridge, Cavalry Song – for the male chorus
 Goodbye! – solo baritone and chorus
 Golden Ukraine, Folksong – full chorus
 Brother for Brother – solo baritone and chorus
 Girls – solo baritone and chorus
 A Twenty-year old – solo baritone and chorus
 Lullaby – mezzo-soprano and chorus
 October Flame – full orchestra and chorus

The text contains many references to Stalin. These were subsequently removed during the Khrushchev Thaw.

The work was premiered on January 5, 1938 in Moscow, conducted by Aleksandr Gauk.

The work was first premiered in Western Europe with the original text by the Goldsmiths Sinfonia and Chorus in London, conducted by Alexander Ivashkin.

References

Cantatas by Sergei Prokofiev
1937 compositions